Santiago "Santi" Comesaña Veiga (born 5 October 1996) is a Spanish professional footballer who plays for Rayo Vallecano as a central midfielder.

Career
Born in Vigo, Galicia, Comesaña was an ED Val Miñor youth graduate. On 9 July 2015, he signed for Segunda División B side Coruxo FC, after impressing on a trial basis.

On 22 August 2015, Comesaña made his senior debut, starting and scoring his team's second in a 3–2 away win against Atlético Astorga FC. On 6 December, he scored a hat-trick in a 5–1 home routing of SD Compostela.

On 16 July 2016, after scoring eight goals in 37 matches during the campaign, Comesaña signed a four-year contract with Rayo Vallecano, freshly relegated to Segunda División. He made his professional debut on 28 August, coming on as a second-half substitute for Adri Embarba in a 0–0 home draw against Real Valladolid.

Comesaña scored his first professional goal on 1 April 2017, netting the first in a 3–1 away win against Girona FC. He contributed with two goals in 33 appearances during the 2017–18 campaign, as his side achieved promotion to La Liga as champions.

Comesaña made his debut in the main category of Spanish football on 25 August 2018, starting in a 1–0 away loss against Atlético Madrid.

Career statistics

Club

Honours
Rayo Vallecano
Segunda División: 2017–18

References

External links

1996 births
Living people
Footballers from Vigo
Spanish footballers
Association football midfielders
La Liga players
Segunda División players
Segunda División B players
Coruxo FC players
Rayo Vallecano players